Yu-4 or Yu 4 may refer to:

Yu-4 torpedo, a Chinese torpedo
, an Imperial Japanese Army transport submarine of World War II